Tian Lei (born 30 November 1970) is a Chinese wrestler. He competed in the men's Greco-Roman 130 kg at the 1992 Summer Olympics.

References

1970 births
Living people
Chinese male sport wrestlers
Olympic wrestlers of China
Wrestlers at the 1992 Summer Olympics
Place of birth missing (living people)
20th-century Chinese people